Brasstown Creek is a stream in the U.S. states of Georgia and North Carolina.

Brasstown Creek took its name from the now-extinct Indian village of Brasstown.

References

Rivers of Georgia (U.S. state)
Rivers of Towns County, Georgia
Rivers of North Carolina
Rivers of Cherokee County, North Carolina
Rivers of Clay County, North Carolina
Tributaries of the Hiwassee River